Lieutenant General Pradeep Chandran Nair, YSM, AVSM  is a serving general officer of the Indian Army. He currently serves as the 21st Director General of Assam Rifles.

Military career 
He did his schooling from St. Joseph's Boys High School, Khadki and Sainik School, Satara and joined National Defence Academy, Khadakwasala in 1982. He was commissioned into 18th Sikh Regiment on 14 Dec 1985, which he later commanded at Faizabad and in Sub Sector Haneef (Siachen Glacier). He has served extensively in the North East in Nagaland, Manipur, Assam and Sikkim. He commanded a Brigade in Manipur, where he was awarded the Yudh Seva Medal and was the Inspector General of Assam Rifles (North) in Nagaland for which he was decorated with the Ati Vishisht Seva Medal. He also has been awarded the Chief of Army Staff Commendation Card on three occasions. He has had instructional appointments at Infantry School Mhow, Headquarters Indian Military Training Team and has been a Directing Staff at Defence Services Staff College, Wellington.

He has served in the Army Headquarters as a Colonel, Major General and Lieutenant General. He has also served as Brigadier General Staff in Maharashtra, Gujarat and Goa Area and in the Defence Intelligence Agency. In his last assignment at the Army Headquarters, he was the Director General Recruiting, responsible for recruiting officers and men and women in the Indian Army.

References

Indian Army officers
Ministry of Home Affairs (India)
Year of birth missing (living people)
Living people
Recipients of the Ati Vishisht Seva Medal
Recipients of the Yudh Seva Medal
National Defence Academy (India) alumni
Indian generals
College of Defence Management alumni
Defence Services Staff College alumni
Academic staff of the Defence Services Staff College